Abul Khair Bhuiyan is a Bangladesh Nationalist Party politician and the former Member of Parliament from Lakshmipur-2.

Career
Bhuiyan was elected to Parliament in the 2008 Bangladesh General Election as a candidate of the Bangladesh Nationalist Party from Lakshmipur-2. He served in the Parliamentary standing committee on LGRD and Cooperatives Ministry. He is the Social Welfare Secretary of Bangladesh Nationalist Party. He is an adviser to the former Prime Minister and Chairman of Bangladesh Nationalist Party Khaleda Zia.

Legal issues
Bhuiyan was charged on 18 September 2008 by the Bangladesh Anti Corruption Commission of embezzling rice.

References

Living people
Year of birth missing (living people)
People from Lakshmipur District
Bangladesh Nationalist Party politicians
6th Jatiya Sangsad members
8th Jatiya Sangsad members
9th Jatiya Sangsad members